Sebastian Piotrowski (born 5 October 1990) is a Polish-German former professional footballer who played as a forward.

He changed career and became an Augustinian Chorherr in the abbey of Parring. He took his vows in 2004.

References

External links
 
 

1990 births
Living people
German footballers
German people of Polish descent
Association football forwards
1. FC Saarbrücken players
FC 08 Homburg players
SVN Zweibrücken players
SV Elversberg players
SV Saar 05 Saarbrücken players
3. Liga players
Sportspeople from Saarbrücken